is a Japanese football player.

Club statistics

Honour
Thai Honda FC

Thai Division 1 League Champion; 2016

References

External links

Michitaka Akimoto on Instagram

1982 births
Living people
Hosei University alumni
Association football people from Shizuoka Prefecture
Japanese footballers
J1 League players
J2 League players
Kyoto Sanga FC players
Ventforet Kofu players
Kataller Toyama players
Association football defenders